Mitsuo Matsumoto   (born July 18, 1971) is a Japanese mixed martial artist. He competed in the Lightweight division.

Mixed martial arts record

|-
| Loss
| align=center| 9-10-1
| Eriya Matsuda
| TKO (punches)
| Pancrase: 2006 Neo-Blood Tournament Semifinals
| 
| align=center| 2
| align=center| 3:46
| Tokyo, Japan
| 
|-
| Win
| align=center| 9-9-1
| Yuichi Ikari
| TKO (doctor stoppage)
| Pancrase: 2006 Neo-Blood Tournament Eliminations
| 
| align=center| 1
| align=center| 2:04
| Tokyo, Japan
| 
|-
| Loss
| align=center| 8-9-1
| Sotaro Yamada
| Submission (rear-naked choke)
| Pancrase: 2005 Neo-Blood Tournament Eliminations
| 
| align=center| 2
| align=center| 2:10
| Tokyo, Japan
| 
|-
| Win
| align=center| 8-8-1
| Tomoya Miyashita
| Decision (unanimous)
| Pancrase: Brave 12
| 
| align=center| 2
| align=center| 5:00
| Tokyo, Japan
| 
|-
| Win
| align=center| 7-8-1
| Hiroyuki Ota
| Decision (unanimous)
| Pancrase: Brave 11
| 
| align=center| 2
| align=center| 5:00
| Tokyo, Japan
| 
|-
| Win
| align=center| 6-8-1
| Motokazu Kobayashi
| Decision (unanimous)
| Pancrase: Brave 8
| 
| align=center| 2
| align=center| 5:00
| Tokyo, Japan
| 
|-
| Loss
| align=center| 5-8-1
| Ippo Watanuki
| Submission (armbar)
| Pancrase: Brave 3
| 
| align=center| 1
| align=center| 3:23
| Tokyo, Japan
| 
|-
| Win
| align=center| 5-7-1
| Hiroki Kotani
| Decision (majority)
| Shooto: 2/6 in Kitazawa Town Hall
| 
| align=center| 2
| align=center| 5:00
| Setagaya, Tokyo, Japan
| 
|-
| Loss
| align=center| 4-7-1
| Kotetsu Boku
| Decision (unanimous)
| Shooto: Treasure Hunt 4
| 
| align=center| 2
| align=center| 5:00
| Setagaya, Tokyo, Japan
| 
|-
| Loss
| align=center| 4-6-1
| Takayuki Okochi
| Decision (unanimous)
| Shooto: Treasure Hunt 2
| 
| align=center| 2
| align=center| 5:00
| Setagaya, Tokyo, Japan
| 
|-
| Win
| align=center| 4-5-1
| Takashi Ochi
| Decision (unanimous)
| Shooto: To The Top 3
| 
| align=center| 2
| align=center| 5:00
| Setagaya, Tokyo, Japan
| 
|-
| Draw
| align=center| 3-5-1
| Hiroki Kotani
| Draw
| Shooto: R.E.A.D. 7
| 
| align=center| 2
| align=center| 5:00
| Setagaya, Tokyo, Japan
| 
|-
| Loss
| align=center| 3-5
| Yohei Suzuki
| Decision (unanimous)
| Shooto: R.E.A.D. 1
| 
| align=center| 2
| align=center| 5:00
| Tokyo, Japan
| 
|-
| Win
| align=center| 3-4
| Kieran Hewett
| Decision (unanimous)
| Shooto: Gateway to the Extremes
| 
| align=center| 2
| align=center| 5:00
| Setagaya, Tokyo, Japan
| 
|-
| Win
| align=center| 2-4
| Shinsuke Ueno
| Decision (unanimous)
| Shooto: Renaxis 3
| 
| align=center| 2
| align=center| 5:00
| Setagaya, Tokyo, Japan
| 
|-
| Loss
| align=center| 1-4
| Koji Takeuchi
| Submission (triangle choke)
| Shooto: Shooter's Passion
| 
| align=center| 2
| align=center| 1:30
| Setagaya, Tokyo, Japan
| 
|-
| Loss
| align=center| 1-3
| Makoto Ishikawa
| Decision (unanimous)
| Shooto: Devilock Fighters
| 
| align=center| 2
| align=center| 5:00
| Tokyo, Japan
| 
|-
| Loss
| align=center| 1-2
| Masakazu Kuramochi
| Decision (unanimous)
| Shooto: Gig '98 1st
| 
| align=center| 2
| align=center| 5:00
| Tokyo, Japan
| 
|-
| Loss
| align=center| 1-1
| Naoya Uematsu
| Decision (unanimous)
| Lumax Cup: Tournament of J '97 Lightweight Tournament
| 
| align=center| 2
| align=center| 3:00
| Japan
| 
|-
| Win
| align=center| 1-0
| Yoshihiro Fujita
| Decision (unanimous)
| Lumax Cup: Tournament of J '97 Lightweight Tournament
| 
| align=center| 2
| align=center| 3:00
| Japan
|

See also
List of male mixed martial artists

References

External links
 

1971 births
Japanese male mixed martial artists
Lightweight mixed martial artists
Living people